Blue Anchor to Lilstock Coast SSSI ( to ) is a 742.8 hectare geological Site of Special Scientific Interest between Blue Anchor and Lilstock in Somerset, notified in 1971.

It provides an outstanding series of sections through the Early Jurassic Lower Lias, spanning the Hettangian and Pliensbachian Stages and named the "Lilstock Formation". This sequence and the good Rhaetian succession beneath are repeatedly affected by faulting, making it of interest to geologists and fossil hunters. It also displays coastal geomorphology which demonstrates a particularly well-developed series of intertidal shore platforms varying in width from about 200-600m. The cliff and beach are rich in reptile remains, including complete skeletons. Lilstock also yields ammonites, shells and fish remains. A unique specimen of an ichthyosaur, named  Excalibosaurus costini  McGowan, 1986 in which the lower jaw is shorter than the upper was found in the Lower Jurassic Sinemurian Stage, Lower Lias beds on the foreshore at Lilstock and is now in the Bristol City Museum and Art Gallery.

The Triassic cliffs have geological interest for the variety of fossils. The coloured alabaster found in the cliffs gave rise to the name of the colour "Watchet Blue". It is on the West Somerset Coast Path.

References

External links
  Natural England website (SSSI Information links)

Sites of Special Scientific Interest in Somerset
Sites of Special Scientific Interest notified in 1971
Geology of Somerset